John Kentish may refer to:
 John Kentish (tenor)
 John Kentish (minister)